Robert Smith Mortuary, also known as the Greek-Shears Mortuary, is a historic mortuary building located in downtown Evansville, Indiana. It was built in 1930, and is a -story, rectangular Mission Revival style brick building. It features arcaded windows, an esplanade, and steeply pitched red tile roof.  It is connected to a -story brick former dwelling constructed about 1890 and remodeled in 1930 to complement the new building.

It was added to the National Register of Historic Places in 1980.

References

Commercial buildings on the National Register of Historic Places in Indiana
Mission Revival architecture in Indiana
Commercial buildings completed in 1930
Buildings and structures in Evansville, Indiana
National Register of Historic Places in Evansville, Indiana